Chechens in Turkey are Turkish citizens of Chechen descent and Chechen refugees living in Turkey. The Chechen diaspora in Turkey dates back to the 19th century when the Russian Empire started ethnically cleansing Caucasians from their homeland, these expulsions would later become known as the Circassian Genocide.

Villages 

Chechen villages in Turkey:

Notable Chechen Turks 
Hüseyin Özkan, Turkish judoka
Ramazan Şahin, Russian-Turkish freestyle wrestler of Chechen descent

References 

Turkey
European diaspora in Turkey